The 2013 America East men's lacrosse tournament was the 14 edition of the America East Conference men's lacrosse tournament  and took place from May 2 to May 4 at Kenneth P. LaValle Stadium in Stony Brook, New York. The winner of the tournament received the America East Conference's automatic bid to the 2013 NCAA Division I Men's Lacrosse Championship. Four teams from the America East conference will compete in the single elimination tournament. The seeds were based upon the teams' regular season conference record.

Standings
Only the top four teams in the America East conference advanced to the America East Conference Tournament.

Schedule

Bracket
Kenneth P. LaValle Stadium - Stony Brook, New York

 denotes an overtime game

All-Tournament
Kevin Glueckert, Albany

Anthony Ostrander, Albany

Lyle Thompson, Albany

Miles Thompson, Albany

Scott Jones, UMBC

Joe Lustgarten, UMBC

Phil Poe, UMBC

Jack Bobzien, Hartford

Alex Matarazzo, Hartford

Brody Eastwood, Stony Brook

Jeff Tundo, Stony Brook

Most Outstanding Player

Lyle Thompson, Albany

References 

http://www.americaeast.com/ViewArticle.dbml?ATCLID=205912260 Retrieved 2015-05-09.

http://www.americaeast.com//pdf9/2054087.pdf?DB_OEM_ID=14000 Retrieved 2015-05-09.

http://www.americaeast.com/standings/Standings.dbml?SPID=6539&DB_OEM_ID=14000&DEF_FY=2012 Retrieved 2015-05-09.

http://www.americaeast.com/SportSelect.dbml?SPSID=65879&SPID=6539&DB_OEM_ID=14000&Q_SEASON=2012 Retrieved 2015-05-09.

http://www.americaeast.com/ViewArticle.dbml?&DB_OEM_ID=14000&ATCLID=207545460 Retrieved 2015-05-09.

America East Men's Lacrosse
America East Men's Lacrosse